All Saints is an Australian television medical drama that premiered on the Seven Network on 24 February 1998. The series aired for twelve seasons, and focused on the fictional lives of doctors and nurses as they dealt with the everyday medical issues that came through the doors of Ward 17, and later in the series, the Emergency Department. The show was created by Bevan Lee and John Holmes, who served as the script executive and executive producer, respectively. The series was produced by Jo Porter, Di Drew, MaryAnne Carroll and Bill Hughes.

Episodes were broadcast on Tuesday nights at 8:30 pm Australian Eastern Standard Time (AEST) for the first ten seasons. The eleventh and twelfth seasons aired after Packed to the Rafters on Tuesday nights at 9:30 pm AEST. All episodes were approximately forty-five minutes, excluding commercials. The first three seasons of the series were broadcast in 4:3, standard definition. The final nine seasons were broadcast in 16:9 in both high definition and standard. In 2014, the complete series was made readily available to stream in America on Hulu. In 2015, the first five seasons were made available for viewing on Presto in Australia. From 2016, reruns of All Saints are currently shown on the Seven Network’s youth-and-retro-oriented network, 7flix.

Series overview

Episode list

Season 1 (1998)

Season 2 (1999)

Season 3 (2000)

Season 4 (2001)

Season 5 (2002)

Season 6 (2003)

Season 7 (2004)

Season 8 (2005)

Season 9 (2006)

Season 10 (2007)

Season 11 (2008)

Season 12 (2009)

See also
 All Saints (TV series)
List of All Saints characters

References 

General
 Zuk, T. All Saints: episode guide, Australian Television Information Archive. Retrieved 24 April 2008.
 TV.com editors. All Saints – Episode Guide, TV.com. Retrieved 24 April 2008.
Specific

All Saints
Episodes